Noel Ruíz Campanioni (born 18 January 1987) is a Cuban sprinter.

Personal bests
200 m: 20.70 s (wind: -0.9 m/s) –  La Habana, 27 May 2011
400 m: 45.53 s –  Barquisimeto, 27 July 2011

Achievements

References

External links

Tilastopaja biography

1987 births
Living people
Cuban male sprinters
Pan American Games medalists in athletics (track and field)
Pan American Games gold medalists for Cuba
Athletes (track and field) at the 2011 Pan American Games
Medalists at the 2011 Pan American Games
People from Santiago de Cuba Province
21st-century Cuban people